June is the sixth month of the year.

June may also refer to:

People
 June (Basque given name), a Basque female given name
 June (given name), a given name used for both girls and boys in the English-speaking countries
 June (singer) (born 1987), Korean R&B singer performing in Japan
 June (surname)
 Jacky June (1924–2012), Belgian musician born Jean-Jacques Junne
 Gilberto García Mena (born 1954), Mexican drug lord, nicknamed El June

Places
 June, Alberta, Canada
 June, Missouri, United States
 June Lake (disambiguation)
 June Mountain, a winter resort in northern California, United States
 June Island, an island in the Debenham Islands, Antarctica

Arts, entertainment, and media

Films
 June, a 2004 television film starring Felicia Day
 June, a 2015 horror film starring Casper Van Dien
 June (2019 film), a Malayalam film
 June (2021 film), a Marathi film

Music
 June (Illinois band), a rock band from Chicago
 June (North Carolina band), an American rock band
 June (Polish band)
 "June", a song by Destroyer from the 2022 album Labyrinthitis
 "June", a song by Prince from the 2015 album Hit n Run Phase One
 "June", a song by Spock's Beard on the 1998 album The Kindness of Strangers
 "June", a song by The Church from the 1993 album Forget Yourself

Other arts, entertainment, and media
 , a Japanese magazine
 June, an alternative name for yaoi (boys' love (BL), or ボーイズ ラブ, or bōizu rabu), a genre of fictional media
 June, a character on Fear the Walking Dead
 "June" (The Handmaid's Tale episode)

Other uses
 June (company), an American home automation company
 June (TV channel), France

See also
 June beetle, the common name for several varieties of scarab beetles
 Ju-ne (born 1997), South Korean male singer and member of boy band iKon
 June bug (disambiguation)
 June List, a political organisation
 June Movement, a political organisation 
 
 Joon (disambiguation)
 Junee, a small town in New South Wales, Australia
 Junie, a given name